Pekan Rabu, which literally means "Wednesday Market", is a shopping centre located in the middle of Alor Star, the state capital of Kedah, Malaysia.

References

External links
Tourism Malaysia - Pekan Rabu

Alor Setar
Shopping malls in Kedah
Shopping malls established in 1978
Tourist attractions in Kedah
1978 establishments in Malaysia